Sarah Davies may refer to:
Sarah Davies (historian), British historian of the Soviet Union
Sarah Emily Davies (1830–1921), English feminist
Sarah Davies (weightlifter) (born 1992), British weightlifter
Sarah Davies, known as Angelle (singer), British singer

See also
Sara Davies, British businesswoman and entrepreneur
Sarah Davis (disambiguation)